Daniele Montevago (born 18 March 2003) is an Italian professional footballer who plays as a centre forward for  club Sampdoria.

Club career 

Born in Palermo, Montevago started playing football at three years old, before joining the local grassroots football school Stella d'Oriente. In 2017, he entered Palermo's youth sector, where he spent two seasons before the club ultimately faced bankruptcy; then, in 2019, he joined Sampdoria.

Following his performances for the Blucerchiati's youth teams, Montevago started training with the first team during the second half of the 2021-22 season, under manager Marco Giampaolo, and received his first call-ups to Serie A match-day squads. In the summer of 2022, the forward extended his contract with Sampdoria until 2025.

In the following campaign, Montevago kept training with the senior squad, under the new coach Dejan Stanković; he subsequently made his professional debut on 29 October 2022, coming in a substitute for Manolo Gabbiadini at the 78th minute of the 3–0 Serie A loss against Inter Milan. On 12 January 2023, he made his first start in a professional game, together with team-mate Flavio Paoletti, in a 1–0 Coppa Italia loss to Fiorentina.

International career 

Montevago has represented Italy at youth international level.

After taking part in training camps with the under-15 and under-16 national teams, he went on to play for the under-20 national team.

Style of play 

Montevago is a centre forward, who has been regarded for his physical strength and his finishing.

Although he has been compared to Christian Vieri, he has actually named Duván Zapata and Fabio Quagliarella as his main sources of inspiration.

Career statistics

References

External links 

 
 

2003 births
Living people
Italian footballers
Association football forwards
Palermo F.C. players
U.C. Sampdoria players
Serie A players
Italy youth international footballers
Footballers from Palermo
Sportspeople from Palermo
Sportspeople from Sicily